Robert Marcel Fontaine (November 14, 1923 – March 25, 1994) was an American professional baseball player, scout and executive. The native of San Jose, California, a World War II veteran, was the first director of scouting for the San Diego Padres of the National League, and served as the third general manager in the history of San Diego's Major League franchise.

As a minor league baseball pitcher, Fontaine went 26–18 in five seasons (1941–42; 1946–48) in the Brooklyn Dodgers' farm system. He missed 1943–45 due to service in the United States Army Air Forces.

Following his playing days, Fontaine was a scout for Branch Rickey's Dodgers and moved to the Pittsburgh Pirates with Rickey in 1951, serving as a Pirates' scout for 18 seasons. He spent eight years (1969–76) as the expansion Padres' first director of amateur scouting, and added the responsibilities of director of player development in 1973. Then, upon the departure of Peter Bavasi for the presidency of the Toronto Blue Jays after the 1976 season, Fontaine was promoted to general manager. He served in that role for 3 seasons, from  through July 7, 1980. The Padres went 255–311 (.451) with one winning season, the first in franchise history, during his tenure.

Fontaine then served as the San Francisco Giants' scouting director until 1992. He died from pneumonia in Poway, California, in 1994 at age 70.

His son Bob Fontaine Jr. has also worked in baseball as a scouting director, and his grandson, Matthew Thomas, was drafted by the Seattle Mariners in 2007.

References

External links

1923 births
1994 deaths
Baseball players from San Jose, California
Brooklyn Dodgers scouts
Major League Baseball farm directors
Major League Baseball general managers
Major League Baseball scouting directors
Mobile Bears players
Montreal Royals players
Olean Oilers players
Pittsburgh Pirates scouts
San Diego Padres executives
San Francisco Giants executives
Santa Barbara Saints players
United States Army Air Forces personnel of World War II